Guri Vesaas (born 13 January 1939) is a Norwegian writer and translator of children's books, and former editor at the publishing house Samlaget.

Biography
Vesaas was born in Vinje, a daughter of novelist Tarjei Vesaas and poet Halldis Moren Vesaas, and sister of Olav Vesaas. She graduated as cand.mag. from the University of Oslo in 1965.

She was awarded the Brage Prize honorary award in 2007, and also the Nynorsk User of the Year award.

She has translated more than 50 children's books into Norwegian, using the pseudonym Hanna Midtbø, after the farm Midtbø in Vinje, where she grew up.

Awards 
NBU-prisen 1996
Bastian Prize 2005
Brage Prize 2007 – honorary award
Royal Norwegian Order of St. Olav 2007 – knight, 1st class.

References

1939 births
Living people
People from Vinje
Norwegian children's writers
Translators to Norwegian
20th-century Norwegian women writers
21st-century Norwegian women writers
Nynorsk-language writers
Norwegian women children's writers